William Cameron (1688-1765) was an Eighteenth Century Irish Anglican priest: the Archdeacon of Ardfert from 1738 until 1765.

Enraght was born in Galway and educated at Trinity College, Dublin. Cameron was ordained on 2 March 1717. In 1728 he became Precentor of Ardfert.

References

18th-century Irish Anglican priests
Archdeacons of Ardfert
Diocese of Limerick, Ardfert and Aghadoe
Christian clergy from County Galway
1688 births
1765 deaths